Andrew Liao Cheung-sing, GBS, SBS, SC, JP (Hong Kong), is a Senior Counsel in Hong Kong. He was a Non-Official Member of the Executive Council of Hong Kong from 2002 to 2017. Martin Liao is his younger brother.

Education
He studied at Ying Wa College. He graduated with an LLB from the University of Hong Kong and an LLM from the London School of Economics and Political Sciences, University of London.

Bauhinia Stars
2001: Silver Bauhinia Star (SBS)
2008: Gold Bauhinia Star (GBS)

References

1950s births
Alumni of the University of Hong Kong
Alumni of St. John's College, University of Hong Kong
Alumni of the University of London
Alumni of Ying Wa College
Members of the Executive Council of Hong Kong
Hong Kong people of Hakka descent
People from Wuhua
Members of the National Committee of the Chinese People's Political Consultative Conference
Members of the Election Committee of Hong Kong, 2017–2021
Members of the Election Committee of Hong Kong, 2021–2026
Members of the Selection Committee of Hong Kong
Living people
Hong Kong Senior Counsel
Recipients of the Gold Bauhinia Star
Recipients of the Silver Bauhinia Star